Malatya İnönü Stadium was a multi-purpose stadium in Malatya, Turkey. It was used mostly for football matches and was the home ground of Yeni Malatyaspor, who moved to the new Malatya Arena. The stadium held 13,000 people. It was named after the Turkish statesman İsmet İnönü. It was demolished in November 2018.

References

External links
Venue information

Football venues in Turkey
Malatyaspor
Multi-purpose stadiums in Turkey
Süper Lig venues
İsmet İnönü
Buildings and structures in Malatya Province
Sports venues completed in 1970